The men's 440 yard breaststroke was a swimming event held as part of the Swimming at the 1904 Summer Olympics programme. It was the first time any breaststroke event was held at the Olympics.  Two later editions of the swimming programme used the 400 metre breaststroke, but the shorter 200 and 100 metre races became more common.

4 swimmers from 2 nations competed.

Results

References

Sources
 

Swimming at the 1904 Summer Olympics